Sydney City Trash is a Sydney-based Country/Punk band consisting of Mitch Hell (vocals, lyrics),  "Browny" Brown (lead guitar), Paddy Finn McHugh (rhythm guitar), Jamie "Jim Mongrel" Skjeme (bass), James Eric Bones (fiddle, mandolin) and Austin Ringo Citizen (drums). Three of its six members grew up in the small town of Tamworth in rural New South Wales, which is also Australia's Country Music Capital and their country roots are frequently reflected in the band's lyrics. The band has been described as the saviours of Australian Country, and is widely respected for its bitingly satirical and dense storytelling lyrics. To date, the band has released three studio albums: Classic Country Hits (2004), Once Upon A Time in Australia (2006)and Terror Australis (2009).

History

Vocalist and Lyricist Mitch Hell was raised in Tamworth in rural New South Wales. After moving to Sydney and fronting various punk, straight edge, hardcore and Oi! bands he met up with former high school mate and fellow Tamworth survivor Paddy 'Toots' McHugh in spring of 2001. The pair wrote their first song the now infamous 'Whiskey in the Sun' in the early 2002 and recorded several incarnations of this song over the next year mostly as a joke, poking fun of where they were raised. However it wasn’t until 2003 with the addition of another Tamworth survivor Browny "Barbecue" Brown the band really started taking shape.

The three Tamworth boys dragged in whatever musicians they could find and busked on the streets of Tamworth during the 2003 Country Music Festival, playing mainly covers by Merle Haggard, David Allen Coe, The Descendents and The Clash. After the festival and inspired by the thrill of performing the boys went into 'Hilltop Studios' in Tamworth to record a demo with the idea of getting a real band together.

The demo worked and by mid-2003 the boys had recruited a drummer Angus Howie (also a Tamworth survivor) a bass player Pig Barnett and even a fiddle player Jim Eric Bones whom was then playing guitar for death metal band Punisha. All six of the boys rehearsed and in late 2003 went back into 'Hilltop Studio' to record their first EP the now legendary "Classic Cuntry Hits."

Over the next year the boys worked hard playing any gig going and writing as much as possible. They became inspired by old Australian bush and folk bands such as Redgum, Roaring Jack and Dingo. They were also heavily influenced by Celtic punk bands such as the Pogues and Flogging Molly. All these influences were used and shaped to make the band's first full-length album 'Once Upon A Time in Australia' which was released on Scott Mac of Toe to Toe's label Sold Our Souls. The album was released to much success and sold over 5,000 copies. Off the back of this the boys played across Australia with a plethora of local and international bands.

Continuing to work hard the boys suffered some casualties of the road. They lost drummer Angus Howie to the glitzy world of TV Ratings and he was replaced by Irish Austin Citizen. With a new energy the boys set about writing for their next album.

Another set back was the loss of the unflappable Pig on bass. R.I.P brother. He was replaced with good friend Jim Mongrel from various south coast punk bands, most notably Run For Cover.

It was with this new line up the boys went in to record at the 'Brain Studios' in Surry Hills, Sydney in early 2009 producing the third and final full-length album 'Terror Australis'.

In 2013 the entire back catalog was released as a downloads on bandcamp. It is available here http://sydneycitytrash.bandcamp.com/

Musical groups from Sydney